Mawatarius is a genus of bryozoans belonging to the monotypic family Mawatariidae.

The species of this genus are found in New Zealand.

Species:

Mawatarius avilae 
Mawatarius inexpectabilis 
Mawatarius secundus

References

Bryozoan genera
Cheilostomatida